The 1990 Nordic Figure Skating Championships were held from February 10th through 11th, 1990 in Helsinki, Finland. The competition was open to elite figure skaters from Nordic countries. Skaters competed in two disciplines, men's singles and ladies' singles, across two levels: senior (Olympic-level) and junior.

Senior results

Men

Ladies

Junior results

Men

Ladies

References

Nordic Figure Skating Championships, 1990
Nordic Figure Skating Championships, 1990
Nordic Figure Skating Championships
International figure skating competitions hosted by Finland
International sports competitions in Helsinki